The 1999-00 West Coast Hockey League season was the fifth season of the West Coast Hockey League, a North American minor professional league. Eight teams participated in the regular season, and the Phoenix Mustangs were the league champions.

Regular season

Taylor Cup-Playoffs

External links
 Season 1999/2000 on hockeydb.com

West Coast Hockey League seasons
WCHL